New York Ukrainians (Ukrainian Sports Club New York) is an American soccer club based in New York City. The club was founded by Ukrainians that had been settled in New York after World War II.

History
The club was founded in 1947. Throughout its history Ukrainians have hosted friendly  international matches with teams such as ACF Fiorentina.
The club's current coach is Steve Kovalenko. Steve has been managing and coaching the team since the 1960s.

Joe Machnik, member of the National Soccer Hall of Fame, was on the 1965 team that won the National Challenge Cup.

Honors 
German-American Soccer League Champion/New York Soccer League Champion: 2
1965-66, 1966-67
National Challenge Cup Winner: 1
1965
National Junior Challenge Cup (James P. McGuire Cup) Winner: 1
1959

References 
Notes

External links
 Футбол - Українська футбольна діаспора

1947 establishments in New York City
Association football clubs established in 1947
Defunct soccer clubs in New York (state)
German-American Soccer League
Men's soccer clubs in New York (state)
Ukrainian-American culture in New York (state)
Ukrainian association football clubs outside Ukraine
Diaspora soccer clubs in the United States
U.S. Open Cup winners